Events in the year 1993 in Cyprus.

Incumbents 

 President: Demetris Christofias
 President of the Parliament: Yiannakis Omirou

Events 
Ongoing – Cyprus dispute

 7 & 14 February – Glafcos Clerides of the Democratic Rally defeated George Vassiliou of the AKEL in presidential elections to become the next president. Voter turnout was 92.4% in the first round and 93.3% in the second round.

Deaths

References 

 
1990s in Cyprus
Years of the 21st century in Cyprus
Cyprus
Cyprus
Cyprus